Sydney Roy Aistrup (7 May 1909 – 1996) was a footballer who played in The Football League for Halifax Town. He was born in Sheffield, England.

References

English footballers
Halifax Town A.F.C. players
English Football League players
1909 births
1996 deaths
Association football forwards